Ornduffia submersa is a species of plant in the Menyanthaceae family of wetland plants that is endemic to Western Australia.

Distribution and habitat
The species occurs within the Avon Wheatbelt, Esperance Plains, Jarrah Forest, Swan Coastal Plain and Warren IBRA bioregions of Southwest Australia.

References

submersa
Asterales of Australia
Eudicots of Western Australia
Taxa named by Helen Isobel Aston
Plants described in 1969